Georg von Hofmann (29 October 1769 (According to other sources: 1771) – 7 May 1845) was an Austrian occasional poet.

Life and work 
Born in Vienna, Hofmann was secretary at the Vienna Theater am Kärntnertor and, as successor to Georg Friedrich Treitschke, opera poet there. He translated many foreign-language opera libretti into German. He wrote two poems for which Franz Schubert composed the music in 1820: Die Zauberharfe (D 644) and Die Zwillingsbrüder (D 647). Hofmann is also said to have provided the textual basis for the alleged rehearsal work with which, according to Anton Schindler, Schubert applied for a vice-conductorship at the Kärntnertortheater in 1826, which failed due to the conduct of the prima donna Nanette Schechner. Otto Erich Deutsch, however, describes this incident as implausible.

Hofmann died in Vienna at the age of 75.

Work

Schauspiele 
 Ludwig und Louise, or: Der 9. Thermidor (Schauspiel) 1815
 Landleben (Lustspiel) 1817
 Das Jagdschloß (Lustspiel) 1819
 Ja! (Lustspiel) 1825

Libretti 
 Helene (opera, music by  Adalbert Gyrowetz) 1816
 Das Rosenhütchen (Große Zauberoper, music by Carl Blum) 1819
 Die Pagen des Herzogs von Vendôme (opera, music by Carl Blum) 1820
 Die Zwillingsbrüder (posse, music by Franz Schubert) 1820
 Die Zauberharfe (Zauberspiel, music by Franz Schubert) 1820
 Der Zauberspruch (opera after Carlo Gozzi's Der Rabe, music by Johann Peter Pixis) 1822
 Die Ochsenmenuette (Singspiel, music after Joseph Haydn by Ignaz von Seyfried) 1823.
 Die Prise Tabak, or Die Vettern als Nebenbuhler (Singspiel) 1825
 Der Haushofmeister (Singspiel) 1825
 Sonderbare Laune, or Sie sind doch verheiratet (Singspiel) 1825
 Die Räuber und der Sänger (operetta) 1830
 Sylva, or Die Macht des Gesanges (opera, music by Karl August Krebs) 1830
 Der Taucher (romantic opera, music by Conradin Kreutzer) 1834

Translations 
 Olympia (opera; translation; libretto by Michel Dieulafoy and Charles Brifaut, music by Gaspare Spontini) 1825
 Der blinde Harfner (opera; translation; libretto by Michel Dieulafoy, music by Adalbert Gyrowetz) 1828
 Semiramis (opera, translation; libretto by Gaetano Rossi, music by Gioachino Rossini) 1833 
 Die Ballnacht (Grand Opera; translation with Ignaz von Seyfried, libretto by Eugène Scribe, music by Daniel-François-Esprit Auber) 1835
 Die Jüdin (grand opera, translation, libretto by Eugène Scribe, music by Jacques Halévy) 1836

References

Further reading 
 Further reading: Hofmann, Georg (Gotthard Josef) Edler von. In Wilhelm Kosch (ed.): Deutsches Literatur-Lexikon. 3rd edition. vol. 7: Haab – Hogrebe. Francke, Bern und München 1979, Sp. 1418 (numerized, retrieved from De Gruyter Online).
 Goedeke

External links 
 
 Werke von Georg von Hofmann im Munich Digitization Center
 Georg von Hofmann on Allmusic

18th-century Austrian writers
19th-century Austrian writers
Austrian librettists
18th-century births
1845 deaths

Year of birth uncertain
Writers from Vienna
Occasional poets
Edlers of Austria